Duisburg-Bissingheim station is a railway station in the Bissingheim district in the town of Duisburg, located in North Rhine-Westphalia, Germany.

References

Railway stations in North Rhine-Westphalia
Buildings and structures in Duisburg
Transport in Duisburg